Daniel Kellogg (also Daniel Kellogge) (February 1630 – December 1688) was a founding settler of Norwalk, Connecticut. He was a deputy of the Connecticut General Assembly of the Colony of Connecticut from Norwalk in the sessions of October 1670, May 1672, October 1674, October 1675, May 1677, October 1679, May 1680, and October 1683.

He was the son of Martin Kellogg and Prudence Bird Kellogg. It is believed that he was a very tall man, perhaps even seven feet tall.

He is listed on the Founders Stone bearing the names of the founding settlers of Norwalk in the East Norwalk Historical Cemetery.

References 

1630 births
1688 deaths
American Puritans
Burials in East Norwalk Historical Cemetery
Connecticut city council members
Deputies of the Connecticut General Assembly (1662–1698)
Founding settlers of Norwalk, Connecticut
People from Great Leighs